Glossonema is a plant genus in the family Apocynaceae, first described as a genus in 1838. It is native to Africa and Southwest Asia.

Species

 Glossonema boveanum (Decne.) Decne. -  Yemen, NE Africa
 Glossonema revoilii Franch. -  tropical Africa
 Glossonema thruppii Oliv. - Somalia
 Glossonema varians (Stocks) Benth. ex Hook.f. -  Iran, Pakistan

References

Apocynaceae genera
Asclepiadoideae